Wagi or WAGI may refer to:

 Wagi, Poland
 Wagi language

 WAGI-LP, a low-power radio station (97.5 FM) licensed to serve Kankakee, Illinois, United States
 WOSF, a radio station (105.3 FM) licensed to serve Gaffney, South Carolina, United States, which held the call sign WAGI-FM from 1971 to 2007